Gypsophila paniculata, the baby's breath, common gypsophila or panicled baby's-breath, is a species of flowering plant in the family Caryophyllaceae, native to central and eastern Europe. Another possible source of this name is it scent, which has been described as sour milk, like a baby’s “spit-up”. Its natural habitat is on the Steppes in dry, sandy and stony places, often on calcareous soils (gypsophila = "chalk-loving"). Specimens of this plant were first sent to Linnaeus from St. Petersburg by the Swiss-Russian botanist Johann Amman.

Cultivation
It is a popular ornamental garden subject, and thrives in well-drained alkaline to neutral soils in full sun. Numerous cultivars have been selected, of which  'Rosenschleier' (with pale pink double flowers) has gained the Royal Horticultural Society's Award of Garden Merit.

Floristry
Gypsophila paniculata is much used in the floristry trade (where it is often simply called "gyp") providing an effective backdrop for larger or more structured blooms. It is commercially cultivated in Peru, forming a major portion of that country's flower exports. It is commonly grown and sold for corsages in the United States.

Invasive
Gypsophila paniculata is now widely distributed in North America. It is classed as an invasive species in places around the Great Lakes, such as the Sleeping Bear Dunes National Lakeshore and the Chicago region, in the Pacific Northwest, and California where it is a declared Noxious weed.

Pests and diseases
Root development is completely inhibited by Pantoea agglomerans pv. glysophilae. Both Pag and Pantoea agglomerans pv. betae cause gall formation. Pag is a problem for the floral industry, for example in the Israeli industry.

Gallery

References

paniculata
Plants described in 1753
Taxa named by Carl Linnaeus